Maz va Langa Sar (also Romanized as Māz va Langā Sar; also known as Māz Langā Sar) is a village in Goli Jan Rural District, in the Central District of Tonekabon County, Mazandaran Province, Iran. At the 2006 census, its population was 217, in 63 families.

References 

Populated places in Tonekabon County